Chesterfield High School is a public high school in Chesterfield, South Carolina, United States, serving students from ninth through twelfth grades for the towns of Chesterfield, Mt. Croghan and Ruby.  Many students also attend from other attendance areas, namely Cheraw, Pageland and even Anson County, NC, due to quality of the Chesterfield-Ruby schools.  The current Chesterfield High School opened in 1969 following the consolidation of the original Chesterfield High School (which served white students), Gary High School (which served African-Americans students), and  Ruby High School.

Athletics
Chesterfield High has won six wrestling state championships (in 2004, 2005, 2007, 2008, 2009, and 2010) and finished as state runners-up twice (2006, 2011).

Chesterfield also won the 2007, 2008, and 2009 1A Football State Championship and were runners-up in 2006. The school's rival are the Eagles from Central High.

The Rams track & field team has been state runner-up several times, and cross country has won several regional championships across the 1A and 2A divisions.

The Lady Rams softball team has won the Class 1A State Championship three times (2008, 2010, 2012). Prior to integration, the original Chesterfield High won state championships in baseball (1962 Class 1A). After runner up finishes in 2008 and 2009, the baseball team won the Class 1A State Championship in 2011.

The school also has state runner-up finishes in boys' track and field (2003 Class 2A), boys' golf (2007 Class 1A), and competitive cheerleading (2007 Class 2A).

The girls' basketball team won state championship (1961 Class 1A) and had a runner-up finish (1959 Class 1A).

Band
The band won their first SCBDA 1A-3A State Championship in 2014 and placed second in 2015.

Bombing
In 2008, the report of a student plotting to bomb Chesterfield High School was caught before the plan was set into motion.

References

External links
 https://web.archive.org/web/20161012224826/http://www.bandsofschesterfield.org/
 http://www.maxpreps.com/high-schools/chesterfield-golden-rams-(chesterfield,sc)/football/home.htm
 http://cfh.chesterfieldschools.org
 http://www.chesterfieldschools.org
 Chesterfield High School picture

Public high schools in South Carolina
Schools in Chesterfield County, South Carolina
Chesterfield County School District